The Police Reform and Social Responsibility Act 2011 (c. 13) is an Act of the Parliament of the United Kingdom. It transfers the control of police forces from police authorities to elected Police and Crime Commissioners. The first police commissioner elections were held in November 2012. The next elections took place in May 2016 and will subsequently take place every four years.

The Act repeals the provisions in the Serious Organised Crime and Police Act 2005 which prohibit protests near Parliament Square, and instead restricts certain "prohibited activities" in Parliament Square garden and the adjoining footways.  The police have used these powers to confiscate pizza boxes, tarpaulin and umbrellas from protesters in Parliament Square.

The Act removed the statutory requirement for the Advisory Council on the Misuse of Drugs to include scientists. The move follows the sacking of David Nutt from the council in 2009.

Section 153 of the Act amends section 1 of Magistrates' Courts Act 1980 so that an arrest warrant for an offence of universal jurisdiction cannot be issued without the consent of the Director of Public Prosecutions, unless applied for by a Crown Prosecutor.

Proposed amendments
In 2021, the government published their proposed Police, Crime, Sentencing and Courts Bill which would amend the Police Reform and Social Responsibility Act, in relation to behaviour around and access to the Parliamentary estate.

References

External links
 Police Reform and Social Responsibility Act on Legislation.gov.uk

United Kingdom Acts of Parliament 2011
Law enforcement in England and Wales
Governance of policing in the United Kingdom
Reform in the United Kingdom